Richard Martin (born October 13, 1967) is an American politician. He is a former member of the South Carolina House of Representatives from the 40th District, serving from 2016 to 2022. He was defeated by Joe White in the 2022 Republican primary. He is a member of the Republican party.

References

Living people
1967 births
Republican Party members of the South Carolina House of Representatives
21st-century American politicians